Uttarakhand Residential University (URU), also known as Uttarakhand Aawasiya Vishwavidyalaya, is a state university located at Almora, Uttarakhand, India. It was established in 2016 by the Government of Uttarakhand through the Uttarakhand Aawasiya Vishwavidyalaya Act, 2016 (Act No. 20 of 2016). It is the second residential university in Uttarakhand following Doon University, and modeled after Jawaharlal Nehru University. The first Vice-Chancellor (VC) was H. S. Dhami, formerly VC of Kumaun University.

Repeal Act 
In June 2020 the government of Uttarakhand repealed the Uttarakhand Aawasiya Vishwavidyalaya Act, 2016 through (Repeal) Act No.19 of 2020. Following that, the UGC removed URU from the list of state universities, effective August 2020.

References

External links

Universities in Uttarakhand
Almora
Educational institutions established in 2016
2016 establishments in Uttarakhand